The 2014 WSBL season was the 26th season of the Women's State Basketball League (SBL). The regular season began on Friday 14 March and ended on Saturday 26 July. The finals began on Saturday 2 August and ended on Friday 29 August, when the Rockingham Flames defeated the Lakeside Lightning in the WSBL Grand Final.

Regular season
The regular season began on Friday 14 March and ended on Saturday 26 July after 20 rounds of competition.

Standings

Finals
The finals began on Saturday 2 August and ended on Friday 29 August with the WSBL Grand Final.

Bracket

Awards

Player of the Week

Statistics leaders

Regular season
 Most Valuable Player: Sami Whitcomb (Rockingham Flames)
 Coach of the Year: Darren Nash (Lakeside Lightning)
 Most Improved Player: Alix Hayward (Perth Redbacks)
 All-Star Five:
 PG: Casey Mihovilovich (Mandurah Magic)
 SG: Sami Whitcomb (Rockingham Flames)
 SF: Alison Schwagmeyer (Kalamunda Eastern Suns)
 PF: Kari Pickens (Lakeside Lightning)
 C: Marita Payne (Cockburn Cougars)

Finals
 Grand Final MVP: Sami Whitcomb (Rockingham Flames)

References

External links
 2014 fixtures
 Women's SBL movements for 2014

2014
2013–14 in Australian basketball
2014–15 in Australian basketball
basketball